Cornillon-Confoux is a commune of the Bouches-du-Rhône department in the region Provence-Alpes-Côte d'Azur. It belongs to the West Provence territory of the metropolis of Aix-Marseille-Provence.

Culture 
Adjacent to the church are three statues of very different women: the Victory of Ikaria, a sculpture by Polish artist Igor Mitoraj, inaugurated at the end of 2007; a Our Lady of Expectation (Virgin Mary pregnant) from 1865; and a Marianne, symbol of the French Republic.There are many traditional French bories (stone shelters) located within the village and surrounding area, and a quite important apiary wall.

Politics

Mayors

Notable people 

Igor Mitoraj (1944–2014), sculptor
Francisque Teyssier (born 1969), cyclist
Mathilde Gros (born 1999), cyclist
 Paul Gros (1920–2013) historian and poet

Population

The inhabitants of the Cornillon-Confoux are called the Cornillonnais.

In 2016, the municipality had 1,372 residents, an increase of 2.24% compared to 2011 Bouches-du-Rhône: +2.22%, France excluding Mayotte: +2.44%).

Climate

See also
Communes of the Bouches-du-Rhône department

References

Communes of Bouches-du-Rhône
Bouches-du-Rhône communes articles needing translation from French Wikipedia